Milesia oshimaensis is a species of hoverfly in the family Syrphidae.

Distribution
Japan.

References

Insects described in 1930
Eristalinae
Diptera of Asia